Jean Bondol, also known as Jean de Bruges, Jean Boudolf, or Jan Baudolf, was a Flemish artist who became a court artist of Charles V of France in 1368.  He is documented as active between 1368 and 1381.

He is best known for producing a number of designs for tapestries, of which the only documented survivals are the huge and very important Apocalypse Tapestry series now at Angers.  He painted the illuminations in a translation of the Vulgate which was presented to Charles V by his valet de chambre Jehan Vaudetar. It is now in the Westreen Museum at the Hague. These illuminations were executed in the year 1371, a period when art in the Netherlands was making rapid advances beyond the conventionality of the early 14th century, and the work of Jean de Bruges is by no means behind that of his contemporaries.

References

Campbell, Thomas P. and Ainsworth, Maryan Wynn, Tapestry in the Renaissance: Art and Magnificence, p. 15, 2002, Metropolitan Museum of Art, fully online
 

Year of birth unknown
Year of death unknown
Artists from Bruges
Early Netherlandish painters
14th-century people from the county of Flanders
Manuscript illuminators
Flemish tapestry artists